LaShawn Merritt (born June 27, 1986) is an American track and field athlete who competes in sprinting events, specializing in the 400 metres. He is a former Olympic champion over the distance and his personal best of 43.65 seconds makes him the ninth fastest of all time.

He was a successful junior athlete and won the 400 m gold at the 2004 World Junior Championships in Athletics, as well as setting two world junior records in the relays. He became part of the American 4×400 meter relay team and helped win the event at the 2006 IAAF World Indoor Championships. He established himself individually in 2007 by winning a silver medal in the 400 m at the 2007 World Championships.

He came out on top of a rivalry with Jeremy Wariner in 2008 by winning in the 2008 Olympic final in a personal best time, and by a record margin of 0.99 secs. He also broke the Olympic record in the relay with the American team, recording the second fastest time ever. Merritt established himself as the World Champion with a win at the 2009 World Championships in Athletics in the 400 m and the 4×400 m relay.

Biography
Merritt is a native of Portsmouth, Virginia where he graduated from Woodrow Wilson High School. LaShawn spent one year as a college athlete at East Carolina University, signing an endorsement contract with Nike during his first season of indoor track, making him no longer eligible to compete in an NCAA event. He then transferred to Old Dominion University in Norfolk, Virginia. He studied business administration at Norfolk State University also located in Norfolk.

Early career
Merritt came to prominence as a junior athlete at the 2004 World Junior Championships in Athletics. He took the gold medal in the 400 meters race and set two junior world records as part of the American 4×100 and 4×400 meter relay teams. He took part in the 2005 World Championships in Athletics, his first major senior championship, and acted as the relay substitute for the men's 4×400  m. He helped the team win their heat and was substituted for Jeremy Wariner for the final, where the American team won the gold medal.

He broke into the senior ranks in 2006, and was selected for the 4×400  m relay team for the 2006 IAAF World Indoor Championships. Along with Tyree Washington, Milton Campbell and Wallace Spearmon, he won the World Indoor title in the event. Outdoors, he improved his best to 44.14  seconds for a bronze medal at the 2006 IAAF World Athletics Final and was selected to represent the United States at the 2006 IAAF World Cup, at which he won the 400  m competition.

Prior to the 400  m final at the 2007 World Championships in Athletics in Osaka, Merritt stated his intent to beat all-comers. He achieved his first sub-44  second run, finishing in 43.96, and beat 2000 Olympic champion Angelo Taylor to the line. However, this was not enough to beat the reigning World and Olympic champion Jeremy Wariner, who was half a second ahead. Nevertheless, the silver medal was Merritt's first at a global championships over the 400  m. He again formed part of the United States' 4×400 meter relay team and, with fellow individual medallists Wariner and Taylor among the team, the American's eased to victory some three and a half seconds ahead of the Bahamians. With Wariner absent from the field, Merritt won the gold medal at the 2007 IAAF World Athletics Final.

Olympic champion and Wariner duels
Merritt's 2008 season was distinguished by a considerable rivalry with Wariner, who had won the 400  m at every major global championship since 2004. The 2008 IAAF Golden League provided the venue for many of their duels. He scored his first major win over Wariner in a close affair at the Internationales Stadionfest in Berlin. He confirmed his Olympic place a month later by winning at the 2008 United States Olympic Trials, again defeating the reigning Olympic champion Wariner. Later in July at the Golden Gala meeting, Wariner responded by edging a win in the 400  m by just 0.01  seconds. At the Meeting Gaz de France in Paris, the last Golden League competition before the Olympics, Wariner seemed to have the momentum behind him after a win in 43.86  seconds.

Merritt won the 400 m at the 2008 Summer Olympics in Beijing. A close race between Merritt and Wariner was expected, though it ultimately ended in a rout. The 0.99-second margin between Merritt's first-place finish and Wariner's second-place finish was the largest in an Olympic 400  m final. His time of 43.75, a new personal best, made him the fifth fastest 400  m runner on the all-time lists, still two places behind Wariner, who is third on the all-time list of fastest runners. He teamed up with Wariner, Angelo Taylor and 400  m bronze medallist David Neville for the men's 4 × 400 m relay. The team defeated the Olympic record mark which had stood since the 1992 Barcelona Olympics by running a time of 2:55.39, the second fastest in the history of the event.

Weeks after the Olympics, he lost to Wariner by a large margin at the Weltklasse Zürich, although Wariner's winning time of 43.82  seconds was still slower than Merritt's Olympic winning run. Merritt secured his fourth win over Wariner that season at the 2008 IAAF World Athletics Final. Although the two had both beaten each other that season, Merritt had won all the most important races, ending the season as the Olympic and American champion over 400  m as well as taking home the World Athletics Final payday. He opted to miss out on the 2009 indoor season to focus on improving his running and technique.

2009 World Champion

With Wariner already qualified for the World Championships as the defending champion, Merritt won the 400  m at the 2009 US Championships somewhat uncontested, equalling his own world leading time of 44.50  seconds. At the 2009 World Championships in Athletics, in Berlin, he went on to win the 400  m in a world-leading time of 44.06 seconds, once again beating Wariner.

On 22 April 2010 it was revealed he had failed three drugs tests and as a result he accepted a provisional suspension. He claimed that the failed drug tests resulted from his use of an over-the-counter penis enlargement product, ExtenZe. Merritt stated that he had not read the small print to check the ingredients of the product, which contains the banned steroid dehydroepiandrosterone. He accepted a two-year ban for the infraction and stated that he had made a "foolish, immature and egotistical mistake...Any penalty I may receive for my action will not overshadow the embarrassment and humiliation I feel".

2011: Return to the track
After his two-year ban was reduced to 21 months, LaShawn Merritt finished second at the Stockholm meeting of the Diamond League series with a time of 44.74. He received a berth to the 2011 World Championships in Daegu, South Korea due to him being the 2009 World Champion for the 400 meters. At the 2011 World Championships, he set a world leading time of 44.35. He eventually won the silver medal behind teenager Kirani James of Grenada, having led most of the race, but went on to run the final leg of the United States' gold medal winning 4 × 400 m relay team having been in third place coming out of the final bend.

2012
Merritt was the number one qualifier at the 2012 Olympic Trials. Two weeks before the track and field events at the 2012 Summer Olympics, Merritt tweaked his hamstring in the Herculis meet in Monaco. As a result of this injury he pulled up in a qualifying heat of the 400m at the London Olympics and did not finish.

2016
Merritt qualified once again onto the US team for the 400 meters at the 2016 Summer Olympics in Rio de Janeiro. He ran a very quick time of 43.85 but only managed to win the bronze medal behind defending Olympic champion, Kirani James of Grenada, who won the silver medal with a time of 43.76, and Wayde van Niekerk of South Africa, who won the gold medal with a new world record time of 43.03.

2017
Merritt announced his retirement following the 2017 World Championships in Athletics.

Personal bests

 All information taken from IAAF profile.

Merritt is one of only six men in history to have broken 20 seconds for the 200 metres and 44 seconds for the 400 metres, the other men being Michael Johnson, Isaac Makwala, Wayde Van Niekerk, Michael Norman, and Fred Kerley.

His personal best of 43.65 seconds for the 400 metres, set in Beijing on 26 August 2015, is the fastest non-winning time in history.

Achievements

References

External links

 
 
 

1986 births
Living people
African-American male track and field athletes
American male sprinters
Athletes (track and field) at the 2008 Summer Olympics
Athletes (track and field) at the 2012 Summer Olympics
Athletes (track and field) at the 2016 Summer Olympics
East Carolina University alumni
Old Dominion University alumni
Olympic gold medalists for the United States in track and field
Sportspeople from Portsmouth, Virginia
Track and field athletes from Virginia
Woodrow Wilson High School (Portsmouth, Virginia) alumni
World Athletics Championships medalists
Medalists at the 2008 Summer Olympics
World Athletics Championships athletes for the United States
Olympic bronze medalists for the United States in track and field
Medalists at the 2016 Summer Olympics
Diamond League winners
USA Outdoor Track and Field Championships winners
World Athletics Indoor Championships winners
IAAF Continental Cup winners
World Athletics Championships winners
IAAF World Athletics Final winners
21st-century African-American sportspeople
20th-century African-American people